Conspiracy Series with Shane Dawson is an American documentary web series created by YouTuber Shane Dawson. The web series was officially announced on January 18, 2019, through a video teaser uploaded to his YouTube channel. The series premiered on January 30, 2019, on his YouTube channel, followed by the second and final episode on February 11, 2019. However, on February 4, 2020, Dawson announced another episode set for release the following day. The series is presented by Dawson, who presents and investigates various conspiracy theories. It is edited by Dawson and cameraman Andrew Siwicki.

The first episode included the 2018 California wildfires Woolsey Fire and Camp Fire and their causes; deepfakes; whether children can be brainwashed by dark themes in cartoons; Walt Disney being cryonically frozen; and Hollister and Abercrombie & Fitch using subliminal messaging. As part of the episodes, Dawson and friends explore and test iPhone theories involving Live Photos, phone calls, FaceTime, and social networking app Zepeto. Dawson also visits for himself the damage caused by the wildfires. It received critical acclaim for its direction, mature themes and dark tone. The first video achieved over 22 million views in the first week. The second episode received over 10 million views in the first 24 hours, and featured Dawson investigating YouTuber Brittani Louise Taylor's struggles with domestic abuse and human trafficking, Adobe Voco and Lyrebird voice manipulation, and Chuck E. Cheese pizzas.

Cast 
 Shane Dawson: The host and creator of the series
 Brittani Louise Taylor: Dawson's friend and a family-vlog YouTuber
 Andrew Siwicki: The co-director, co-editor, and cameraman of the series
 Ryland Adams: Dawson's fiancé (then boyfriend) who is also a YouTuber
 Morgan Adams: Ryland's sister and a fellow YouTuber
 Garrett Watts: Dawson's friend and a fellow YouTuber

Episodes

Responses 
Dawson's video on Chuck E. Cheese's leftover pizza garnered a response from the company's spokesperson: "The claims made in this video about Chuck E. Cheese's and our pizza are unequivocally false ... No conspiracies here—our pizzas are made to order and we prepare our dough fresh in restaurant, which means that they’re not always perfectly uniform in shape, but always delicious."

Dawson's videos also created a response from YouTube, who said "as part of our ongoing efforts to improve the user experience across our site, we'll begin reducing recommendations of borderline content or videos that could misinform users in harmful ways." Initially the video was demonetized by YouTube, however this decision was later reversed. The company announced that "after manual review, YouTube reinstated Dawson's ability to include ads on the video, saying it wasn't in violation of the site's advertising guidelines. It was also able to appear on the front page and be recommended to other users."

References 

American non-fiction web series
2010s YouTube series
Conspiracy web series
Shane Dawson
2019 web series debuts
2020s YouTube series